Mount Aeolus is a mountain located in the Bosche Range in Alberta, Canada.  The mountain was named for Aeolus, the Greek god of winds. The summit was so named on account of frequent windy conditions near it.

References

Two-thousanders of Alberta